Encephalartos arenarius is a species of cycad in the family Zamiaceae. It is endemic to South Africa, where it is limited to the Eastern Cape. Its common names include Alexandria cycad and dune cycad.

Description
This plant has a partially buried stem in the shape of an egg, with a diameter of 20-30 cm and a height of one meter from the mother.
Lanceolate leaves, irregularly twisted on themselves, and 100 to 150 cm long, are composed of leathery leaves alternately arranged in the spine. The base of the petiole is glabrous and tomentose on the dorsal side of the ventral.

It is a dioecious species, with fusiform male cones, greenish, 30–50 cm long and 8–15 cm in diameter, and cylindrical female cones, 35–60 cm long and 20–30 cm in diameter.

The seeds are 20-25 mm wide. They are red and approximately spherical in shape.

Distribution
This species lives in densely wooded dune habitat and scrub. It is an endangered species with a maximum global population estimated at around 1500 mature individuals. Most subpopulations occur near the town of Alexandria, Eastern Cape. The main threat to the species is overcollection.

References

External links
Encephalartos arenarius. Tropicos.
 
 

arenarius
Endemic flora of South Africa